Sandra Morán Reyes (born 29 April 1960) is a Guatemalan politician, who was elected to the Congress of Guatemala in the 2015 election. An out lesbian, she is noted as the first out LGBT person ever elected to the national legislature in Guatemala. She is a member of Convergence, a new progressive party which had two other members elected to the assembly.

A longtime LGBT and feminist activist and artist, she was an organizer of Guatemala's first lesbian group in 1995 and its first LGBT pride event in 1998. She previously lived in exile in Mexico, Nicaragua, and Canada between 1981 and 1994. She joined Guatemala’s human rights movement in high school when she was fourteen years old. She was active in music, playing in the band Kin Lalat in the 1980s.

On 21 May 2019, she confirmed that she would not run for re-election.

References

Members of the Congress of Guatemala
Lesbian politicians
Guatemalan feminists
Guatemalan LGBT people
Living people
Guatemalan LGBT rights activists
Guatemalan activists
21st-century Guatemalan women politicians
21st-century Guatemalan politicians
Guatemalan women activists
1960 births
LGBT legislators
Women civil rights activists